The men's 1000 metres in short track speed skating at the 1994 Winter Olympics took place on 22 February at the Hamar Olympic Amphitheatre.

Results

Heats
The first round was held on 22 February. There were eight heats, with the top two finishers moving on to the quarterfinals.

Heat 1

Heat 2

Heat 3

Heat 4

Heat 5

Heat 6

Heat 7

Heat 8

Quarterfinals
The quarterfinals were held on 22 February. The top two finishers in each of the four quarterfinals advanced to the semifinals.

Quarterfinal 1

Quarterfinal 2

Quarterfinal 3

Quarterfinal 4

Semifinals
The semifinals were held on 22 February. The top two finishers in each of the two semifinals qualified for the A final, while the third and fourth place skaters advanced to the B Final.

Semifinal 1

Semifinal 2

Finals
The four qualifying skaters competed in Final A, while four others raced for 5th place in Final B. Derrick Campbell failed to finish the final, not completing the sufficient number of laps, and Nicky Gooch was disqualified, so the winner of the B final, Marc Gagnon was awarded the bronze medal.

Final A

Final B

References

Men's short track speed skating at the 1994 Winter Olympics